Ashland National Forest was established as the Ashland Forest Reserve by the General Land Office in Oregon on September 28, 1893, with .  In 1905 federal forests were transferred to the U.S. Forest Service. Ashland became a National Forest on March 4, 1907, and on July 1, 1908, the entire forest was combined with parts of Cascade, Klamath and Siskiyou National Forests to establish Crater National Forest.  The lands are presently included in Rogue River National Forest.

References

External links
Forest History Society
Forest History Society:Listing of the National Forests of the United States Text from Davis, Richard C., ed. Encyclopedia of American Forest and Conservation History. New York: Macmillan Publishing Company for the Forest History Society, 1983. Vol. II, pp. 743-788.

Former National Forests of Oregon
Rogue River-Siskiyou National Forest
1907 establishments in Oregon
Protected areas established in 1907
1908 disestablishments in Oregon
Protected areas disestablished in 1908